Air Marshal Sir Richard Carlyle Nelson, KCB, OBE, CStJ, QHP(November 13, 1907 – November 5, 2001) was a Canadian air marshal who acted as director-General of the RAF medical services from 1962 to 1967 and Honorary Physician to the Queen from 1961 until 1967.

Biography 
Nelson was born in Ponoka, Alberta, Canada, on November 13, 1907 to Marcus Nelson and Jane Amelia Cartwright.  He graduated from the University of Alberta with his MD and, In the 1930s, moved to the UK, where in 1934, he joined the RAF.  When Nelson retired from the royal air force in 1967, he held the rank of air marshal.

Military service 
Nelson joined the RAF in 1934 as a Flying Officer.  In 1936 he was promoted to the rank of Flight Lieutenant which he held until 1940.  When the RAF established a field hospital at Fuka in the Western Desert, he was the senior medical Flight Lieutenant in the Middle East and was appointed to command it.  As the post was a Wing Commander's post, he went straight from Flight Lieutenant to Wing Commander.  He remained in this rank until he was promoted to Group Captain in the 1950s.  In 1957, he was promoted to Air Commodore.  Two years after, in 1959, he was promoted to the acting rank of Air Vice-Marshal.  During Nelson's tenure as Air Vice-Marshal, he was made Honorary Physician to the Queen (QHP) in 1961.  His final promotion in 1962 made him an Air-Marshal and he was created as Director-General RAF medical services until his military retirement in 1967.

Honours 
Throughout his career, Nelson was a decorated officer.  in 1949 He was made an officer of the Order of the British Empire (OBE).  In 1961 he was created Honorary Physician to the Queen (QHP).  One year later, in 1962, he was created Commander of the Order of Bath (CB).  In 1963 he was knighted as Knight Commander of the Order of Bath (KCB).  This made him Sir Richard Nelson.  In 1964, Nelson was made a Commander of the order of Saint John (CStJ).

After Service 
After his retirement from the RAF (1967), Nelson joined the Nicholas Research Institute in Slough, as Medical Director and Director of Research until his retirement in October 1972.  He died in 2001 at his home in Hampshire, UK.

References 

Knights Grand Cross of the Order of the Bath
University of Alberta alumni
Royal Air Force personnel of World War II
Air marshals
Non-British Royal Air Force personnel of World War II
Officers of the Order of the British Empire
Commanders of the Order of St John
People from Ponoka, Alberta
1907 births
2001 deaths